Dipterocarpus retusus, commonly known as hollong, is a large tree and perhaps the best known species in the genus Dipterocarpus. It is native to China, Vietnam, Philippines, Laos, Cambodia, Malaysia, Indonesia, Myanmar, and India.

Hollong is the state tree of Assam and Arunachal Pradesh, India. In India, the timber is used for plywood and making various containers. In China, the timber is used in construction. Hollong is a sacred tree for Moran community of Assam.

Uses
It is farmed for its timber and resin. In Cambodia, the resin is collected by people in the mountainous regions, in order to make torches and candles, while the wood is used in construction to make columns and boards.

References

retusus
Trees of China
Flora of tropical Asia
Medicinal plants of Asia
Symbols of Arunachal Pradesh
Symbols of Assam